Worthington Hall, now known as the Shawnee Playhouse, was a historic theatre located in Smithfield Township, Monroe County, Pennsylvania. It was built in 1904.

It was added to the National Register of Historic Places in 1978. It was delisted in 1986 after being demolished following a fire—caused by arson—on June 24, 1985. With help from the people of Shawnee on Delaware, the Seabees, the Hughes Foundation, the National Endowment for the Arts, The National Trust, a Community Development Block Grant, and generous donations from many individuals and friends, the playhouse was rebuilt.

References

External links
 Shawnee Playhouse - official site

Theatres on the National Register of Historic Places in Pennsylvania
Theatres completed in 1904
Buildings and structures in Monroe County, Pennsylvania
Tourist attractions in Monroe County, Pennsylvania
National Register of Historic Places in Monroe County, Pennsylvania
Former National Register of Historic Places in Pennsylvania